Gus Mailetoa-Brown (born 28 July 1975) is a former Western Samoa international rugby league footballer.

Playing career
A Manurewa and Papakura junior, Mailetoa-Brown first attracted interest from the Brisbane Broncos. However, by 1994 he was playing for the Counties Manukau Heroes in the Lion Red Cup.  He was signed with the Auckland Warriors in 1995 but never played a first grade game for the club and was released in June 1996. He scored two tries in the 1996 Lion Red Cup grand final, being part of the Counties Manukau side that lifted the trophy.

While playing for the Eastern Tornadoes in 1999, Malietoa-Brown represented Auckland South.

He played for the Mt Albert Lions in the 2004 Bartercard Cup. Malietoa-Brown later played club games for the Manurewa Marlins in the Auckland Rugby League competition, including in 2011.

Representative career
Mailetoa-Brown was a Samoan international and played at the 1995 Rugby League World Cup.

Personal life
Malietoa-Brown, grew up in Manurewa and is the grandson of Malietoa Tanumafili II. Malietoa-Brown is also first cousins to both Nigel and Joe Vagana. Gus attended De La Salle College in Auckland.

References

External links
World Cup 1995 details

Living people
Samoa national rugby league team players
Counties Manukau rugby league team players
Papakura Sea Eagles players
Manurewa Marlins players
Mount Albert Lions players
1975 births
Auckland rugby league team players
Eastern Tornadoes players
Junior Kiwis players
New Zealand sportspeople of Samoan descent
Rugby league five-eighths
Rugby league centres
Rugby league locks